William Henry Summerville (August 1862 – 21 May 1919) was a member of the Queensland Legislative Assembly.

Biography
Summerville was born at Ipswich, Queensland, the son of Samuel Summerville and his wife Elizabeth (née Thompson). He was educated at Ipswich Grammar School and established the law firm, Summerville & Delaney.

On 22 July 1892 he married Annie Agnes Herbert (died 1941) and together had two sons and three daughters. He died in Ipswich in May 1919 and was buried in the Ipswich General Cemetery.

Public life
Summerville was an alderman on the Ipswich City Council and Mayor of the city in 1903. He won the seat of Stanley for Labour in the Queensland Legislative Assembly at the 1902 state election, but was defeated two years later.

Street name
A number of street names in the Brisbane suburb of Carina Heights are identical to the surnames of former Members of the Queensland Legislative Assembly. One of these is Summerville Street.

References

Members of the Queensland Legislative Assembly
1862 births
1919 deaths
Burials at Ipswich General Cemetery
Australian Labor Party members of the Parliament of Queensland